Maly Aral is a rural locality (a selo) in Aksaraysky Selsoviet, Krasnoyarsky District, Astrakhan Oblast, Russia. The population was 513 as of 2010. There are 7 streets.

Geography 
Maly Aral is located 23 km northeast of Krasny Yar (the district's administrative centre) by road. Baybek is the nearest rural locality.

References 

Rural localities in Krasnoyarsky District, Astrakhan Oblast